China Railway High-speed (CRH) is a high-speed rail service operated by China Railway.

The introduction of CRH series was a major part of the sixth national railway speedup, implemented on April 18, 2007. By the end of 2020, China Railway High-speed provided service to all provinces in China, and operated just under  passenger tracks in length, accounting for about two-thirds of the world's high-speed rail tracks in commercial service. China has revealed plans to extend the HSR to 70,000 km by year 2035. It is the world's most extensively used railway service, with 2.29 billion bullet train trips delivered in 2019 and 2.16 billion trips in 2020, bringing the total cumulative number of trips to 13 billion as of 2020.

In 2017, the China Standardized EMU brand including CR400AF/BF and CR200J joined China Railway High-speed and are designated as Fuxing together with letters CR (China Railway). With a gradual plan, the CR brand is going to replace the current CRH brand in service.

Depending on their speed, there are 3 categories of high speed trains, G, D and C (G and some C being the fastest at 350 km/h, D having a speed of 250 km/h and C having a speed of 200 km/h).

High-speed rail network

High-speed rail services were first introduced in 2007 operating with CRH rolling stock.

China will continue to operate the largest high-speed rail (HSR) network in the world by the end of 2021, with a length of over 40,000 km (24,855 mi). Beijing to Hong Kong High Speed Railway, the longest HSR route in the world, stretches 2,440 km (1,516 mi).

CRH service on dedicated high-speed lines

CRH service on upgraded conventional lines

Over time with the completion of the national high-speed passenger-dedicated rail network, more CRH service will shift from these lines to the high-speed dedicated lines.

A. Intercity service (typically, listed in schedules as C-series or D-series trains):
 Beijing – Beidaihe, Qinhuangdao
 Beijing – Tianjin, Tanggu
 Beijing – Shijiazhuang, Taiyuan
 Shanghai – Kunshan, Suzhou, Wuxi, Changzhou, Nanjing, Hefei, Xuzhou
 Shanghai – Hangzhou, Yiwu, Jinhua, Quzhou
 Nanjing – Hangzhou
 Guangzhou – Shenzhen
 Shenzhen – Jiangmen – Zhanjiang
 Wuhan – Zhengzhou, Changsha
 Changsha – Nanchang
 Xi'an – Baoji
B. Long-haul service (typically, listed in schedules as G-series or D-series trains):
 Beijing – Shenyang, Changchun, Harbin
 Beijing – Jinan, Qingdao, Shanghai
 Beijing – Zhengzhou, Wuhan
 Shanghai – Zhengzhou, Qingdao, Shenyang
 Shanghai – Nanchang
 Wuhan – Changsha – Guangzhou

Overnight high-speed trains

Unlike the "conventional" (non-CRH trains), which run round the clock, most high-speed rail lines operations shut down each night. There are several sleeper EMU services (abbreviated 动卧) running on the upgraded rail or high-speed lines operated with CRH1E and CRH2E trains.

Conventional Z-series overnight rail services may also use certain sections of the high-speed rail network; e.g., the planned Shanghai-Chengdu train Z121/2/3/4 will use the Huhanrong PDL from Nanjing to Wuhan.

With the schedule change planned for December 21, 2012, some of these trainsets will be re-purposed to also provide overnight high-speed service between Shanghai and Xi'an North. In the 2014, Chunyun season, overnight HSR trains first ran on Beijing-Guangzhou (Jingguang) and other lines.

In November 2016, CRRC Changchun unveiled CRH5E bullet train carriages with sleeper berths. Made in the CRRC factory in Changchun and nicknamed Panda, they are capable of running at 250 km/h, operate at -40 degrees Celsius, have Wi-Fi hubs and contain sleeper berths that fold into seats during the day. In 2017, CRRC unveiled a high speed train with double decked sleeper "capsules" classed as the CRH2E series high speed rail train.

Rolling stock

China Railway High-speed runs different electric multiple unit trainsets, the name Hexie Hao is for designs which are imported from other nations and designated CRH-1 through CRH-5 and CRH380A(L), CRH380B(L), and CRH380C(L). CRH trainsets are intended to provide fast and convenient travel between cities. Some of the Hexie Hao train sets are manufactured locally through technology transfer, a key requirement for China. The signalling, track and support structures, control software, and station design are developed domestically with foreign elements as well. By 2010, the track system as a whole is predominantly Chinese. China currently holds many new patents related to the internal components of these trains, re-designed in China to allow the trains to run at higher speeds than the foreign designs allowed. However, these patents are only valid within China, and as such hold no international power. The weakness on intellectual property of Hexie Hao causes obstruction for China to export its high-speed rail related product, which leads to the development of the completely redesigned train brand called Fuxing Hao that based on indigenous technologies.

The trainsets are as follows:
Hexie (Harmony)
 CRH1 produced by Bombardier Transportation's joint venture Sifang Power (Qingdao) Transportation (BST), CRH1A, and CRH1B, nicknamed "Metro" or "Bread", derived from Bombardier's Regina; CRH1E, nicknamed "Lizard", is Bombardier's ZEFIRO 250 design
 CRH1A: sets consists of 8 cars; maximum operating speed of 250 km/h
 CRH1B: a modified 16-car version; maximum operating speed of 250 km/h
 CRH1E: a 16-car high-speed sleeper version; maximum operating speed of 250 km/h
 CRH2: nicknamed "Hairtail", derived from E2 Series 1000 Shinkansen
 CRH2A: In 2006, China unveiled CRH2, a modified version of the Japanese Shinkansen E2-1000 series. An order for 60 8-car sets had been placed in 2004, with the first few built in Japan, the rest produced by Sifang Locomotive and Rolling Stock in China.
 CRH2B: a modified 16-car version of CRH2; maximum operating speed of 250 km/h
 CRH2C (Stage one): a modified version of CRH2 with a maximum operating speed up to 300 km/h as a result of replacing two intermediate trailer cars with motored cars
 CRH2C (Stage two): a modified version of CRH2C (stage one) has a maximum operating speed up to 350 km/h by using more powerful motors
 CRH2E: a modified 16-car version of CRH2 with sleeping cars
 CRH3: nickname "Rabbit", derived from Siemens ICE3 (class 403); 8-car sets; maximum operating speed of 350 km/h
 CRH5A: derived from Alstom Pendolino ETR600; 8-car sets; maximum operating speed of 250 km/h
 CRH6: designed by CSR Puzhen and CSR Sifang, will be manufactured by CSR Jiangmen. It is designed to have two versions: one with a top operating speed of 220 km/h; the other with a top operating speed of 160 km/h. They will be used on 200 km/h or 250 km/h Inter-city High Speed Rail lines; planned to enter service by 2011
 CRH380A;  Maximum operating speed of 380 km/h. Developed by CSR based on CRH2 and manufactured by Sifang Locomotive and Rolling Stock; entered service in 2010
 CRH380A: 8-car version
 CRH380AL: 16-car version
 CRH380B: upgraded version of CRH3; maximum operating speed of 380 km/h, manufactured by Tangshan Railway Vehicle and CRRC Changchun Railway Vehicles; entered service in 2011
 CRH380B: 8-car version
 CRH380BL: 16-car version
 CRH380CL: designed and manufactured by CRRC Changchun Railway Vehicles. Maximum operating speed of 380 km/h; entered service in 2012
 CRH380D: also named Zefiro 380; maximum operating speed of 380 km/h, manufactured by Bombardier Sifang (Qingdao) Transportation Ltd.; entered service in 2012
CRH380D: 8-car version
 CRH380DL: 16-car version (Cancelled in place of additional CRH1A and Zefiro 250NG sets)
CRH1A, B,E, CRH2A, B,E, and CRH5A are designed for a maximum operating speed (MOR) of 200 km/h and can reach up to 250 km/h. CRH3C and CRH2C designs have an MOR of 300 km/h, and can reach up to 350 km/h, with a top testing speed more than 380 km/h. However, in practical terms, issues such as maintenance costs, comfort, and safety make the maximum speed of more than 380 km/h impractical and remain limiting factors.

Fuxing (Rejuvenation)
 CR400AF: Maximum operating speed of 400 km/h; Developed by CRRC Qingdao Sifang, guided by Chinese EMU standard.
 CR400BF: Maximum operating speed of 400 km/h; Developed by CRRC Changchun Railway Vehicles, guided by Chinese EMU standard.

Chinese MOR CRH trainsets order timetable

Chinese MOR CRH trainsets order timetable

Chinese CRH trainsets delivery timetable
Based on data published by Sinolink Securities; some small changes were made according to the most recent news.

 All CRH380B and CRH380C units to be delivered before 2012.
 All CRH380D units to be delivered before 2014.

Ridership

Annual HSR ridership is highest in the world and has ramped up very quickly, as self-reported by rail authorities.  China is the third country, after Japan and France, to have one billion cumulative HSR passengers.  Ridership in 2018 is above 2 billion per year. Nevertheless, a breakdown for lines and services is not available, system ridership may be overestimated given transfer connections within the system may be counted as new passengers each time.

Technology development

Before the introduction of foreign technology, China conducted independent attempts to domestically develop high-speed rail technology. Some notable results included the China Star, but domestic Chinese companies lacked the technology and expertise of foreign companies, and the research process consumed a large amount of time. People's Republic of China Ministry of Railways spokesman Zhang Shuguang stated that due to historical reasons, China's overall railway technology and equipment is similar to that of developed countries' rail systems in the 1970s; high-speed rolling stock development is still in its infancy stage. If using only their own resources and expertise, the country might need a decade or longer to catch up with developed nations. In 2004, the Chinese State Council and the Ministry of Railways defined a modern railway technology and equipment policy as "the introduction of advanced technology, the joint design and production, to build China brand".

Technology introduction

On April 9, 2004, the Chinese government held a conference on modern railway equipment and rolling stock, in which they drafted the current Chinese plan to modernize the country's railway infrastructure with advanced technologies.

On June 17, 2004, the Ministry of Railways launched the first round of bidding on the high-speed rail technology, but the company must be:
 
legally registered in the PRC, with rail EMU manufacturing capacity
able to manufacture trains with the ability to reach 

High-speed EMU design and manufacturing technology companies, including Siemens, Alstom, Kawasaki Heavy Industries and Bombardier, initially had hoped to enter into a joint venture in China, but was rejected by the Ministry of Railways. The MOR set these guidelines for joint ventures to be acceptable:

comprehensive transfer of key technologies
lowest price in the world
use of a Chinese brand

A comprehensive transfer of technology to Chinese enterprises (especially in systems integration, AC drive and other core technologies) was requested to allow domestic enterprises to access and utilise the core technology. While foreign partners might provide technical services and training, the Chinese companies must ultimately be able to function without the partnership. Railway equipment manufacturers in China were free to choose foreign partners, but foreign firms must pre-bid and sign the technology transfer agreement with China's domestic manufacturers, so the Chinese rolling stock manufacturers could comprehensively and systematically learn advanced foreign technology. However, this requirement to sign over all rights to the technology used in the trains was a significant barrier to international involvement in the project, as the companies would lose access to any technology that they used on the trains.

In the first round of bidding, 140 rolling stock orders were divided into seven packages of twenty orders each. After extensive review and negotiation, three consortiums won the bid:

Changchun Railway Vehicles Co., Ltd. (owned by CNR) with France's Alstom
Sifang Locomotive (owned by CSR) with Japan's Kawasaki Heavy Industries
Sifang Locomotive (owned by CSR) with Canada's Bombardier

These three consortiums were each given three, three, and one twenty order packages respectively. Germany's Siemens, as a result of an expensive technology bid — the prototype vehicle cost was 350 million yuan each column, technology transfer fee 390 million euros — did not get any orders in the first round. EMU tendered  22.7 billion yuan for technology transfer payments in the first payment, accounting for 51 per cent of the amount of the tender.

Innovation
The core technology innovations necessary for a high-speed rail system to meet the needs of China's railway development resulted in the Ministry of Science and Ministry of Railways signing the "independent innovation of Chinese high-speed train cooperation agreement Joint Action Plan" on February 26, 2008. Academicians and researchers from CAS, Tsinghua University, Zhejiang University, Southwest Jiaotong University, and Beijing Jiaotong University have committed to working together on basic research into improving China's scientific and industrial resources into developing a high-speed train system.

Under the agreement, China's joint action plan for improvement of train service and infrastructure has four components:
 Establish intellectual property rights and international competitiveness
 Ministry of Science and the Ministry of Railways will work together to enhance industry research alliances, and innovation capability
 Promote China-related material and equipment capacity

The Chinese Ministry of Science has invested nearly 10 billion yuan in this science and technology plan, which is by far the largest investment program. The project has brought together a total of 25 universities, 11 research institutes, and national laboratories, and 51 engineering research centers. The Ministry of Science hopes to develop basic research sufficient to produce key technologies necessary to develop trains capable of  through the "863 Project" and "973 Project".

Technology export
On 27 July 2009, Chinese Ministry deputy chief engineer Zhang Shuguang stated that the United States, Saudi Arabia and Brazil are interested in Chinese high-speed railway technology. July 28. The Federal Railroad Administration and the US government are negotiating on the introduction of Chinese railway technology. On 14 October 2009, Prime minister of Russia Vladimir Putin and the Russian Railroad Administration signed an Organizing and developing railway in Russia memo with Ministry of Railways of China, planning to build a high-speed railway from Vladivostok to Khabarovsk.

Accident

On 23 July 2011 at approximately 20:00 CST, two high-speed trains travelling on the Yongtaiwen railway line No. D301 and No. D3115  bound for Fuzhou collided on a viaduct near Wenzhou, Zhejiang, leading to 40 deaths and 191 injuries. Both trains were on the same rail track, headed in the same direction. D3115 ground to a halt in front of D301 due to a loss of electric power caused by lightning striking a viaduct near the Ou River. Signalling systems purportedly failed, and D301 rear-ended the first train, sending four carriages off the viaduct.
on June 4, 2022 at 10:30 CST, train D2809 bound for Guangzhou East/Guangzhou from Guiyang North to Guangzhou East/Guangzhou ran into a mudslide near the Rongjiang Station of the Chengdu Railway Bureau on the Guiyang-Guangzhou High-speed Railway and derailed, causing the seventh and eighth The carriage derailed and rushed onto the platform of Rongjiang Station, killing the driver and injuring 12 passengers.

See also

 High-speed rail in China
 China Star
 Z-series trains
 Hexie (train)
 Fuxing (train)

References

 Shanghai-Beijing route to test bullet train. China Daily. January 16, 2007.

High-speed rail in China